Status Update is a 2018 American direct-to-video teen comedy romance film, directed by Scott Speer, from a screenplay by Jason Filardi. It stars Ross Lynch and Olivia Holt.

The film had a limited release on March 23, 2018, before being released through video on demand on March 30, 2018, by Vertical Entertainment.

Premise 
A not-so-popular high schooler named Kyle Moore is uprooted by his parents' separation and struggles to fit into his new hometown. Then he stumbles upon a magical app that causes his social media updates to come true, which brings all of his wildest real-world fantasies to life.

Cast 
 Ross Lynch as Kyle Moore
 Olivia Holt as Dani McKenzie
 Courtney Eaton as Charlotte Alden
 Diana Bang as Principal Kim
 Martin Donovan as Mr. Alden
 Harvey Guillen as Lonnie Gregory
 Gregg Sulkin as Derek Lowe
 Brec Bassinger as Maxie Moore
 Alexandra Siegel as Ms. Wescott
 Rob Riggle as Darryl Moore
 Famke Janssen as Katherine Alden
 John Michael Higgins as Mr. Moody
 Wendi McLendon-Covey as Ann Moore
 Josh Ostrovsky as Bearded Guy

Production 
In November 2014, The Hollywood Reporter announced that Ross Lynch would star in a new supernatural/comedy/romance film called Status Update, set in New England. Legendary's Asylum Entertainment bought the pitch from 17 Again writer Jason Filardi. Offspring Entertainment's Jennifer Gibgot and Adam Shankman produced with Voltage's Dominic Rustam and Brightlight’s Shawn Williamson. Scott Speer directed the film. The film went into production in Vancouver, British Columbia in June 2016.

Release
Status Update had a limited release on March 23, 2018, before being released through video on demand on March 30, 2018, by Vertical Entertainment.

References

External links
 
 

2018 films
2010s teen comedy films
Vertical Entertainment films
Films directed by Scott Speer
American teen comedy films
2018 romantic comedy films
2018 direct-to-video films
2010s English-language films
2010s American films
Films about social media